Maya Alagh is an Indian television and film actress.

Personal life
Maya is married to Sunil Alagh, who is a former managing director and CEO of Britannia Industries. Their daughter Anjori Alagh is also an actress. Maya started off her career as a model. She was noticed by actor, Dalip Tahil when she had gone to pick up her husband, Sunil Alagh. Dalip offered her an ad film, which she auditioned for. She was however rejected because she didn't 'look poor enough'.

Maya made her television debut with the mystery-drama Chhoti Badi Baatein. It aired on Doordarshan TV (previously DD National) in the year 1986. The serial was based on the concept of superstitions.

Filmography

 Umrao Jaan (2006)
 Mere Jeevan Saathi (2006)
 Page 3 (2005)
 LOC Kargil (2003)
 Sssshhh... (2003)
 Andaaz (2003)
 Talaash: The Hunt Begins... (2003)
 Mujhse Dosti Karoge! (2002)
 Rehnaa Hai Terre Dil Mein (2001)
 Albela (2001)
 Kachche Dhaage (1999)
 Wajood (1998)
 Sanam (1997)
 Aashique Mastane (1995)
 Ram Shastra  (1995)
 Diya Aur Toofan (1995)
 Guddu (1995)
 Saajan Ki Baahon Mein (1995)
 Dance Party (1995)
 Jawab (1995)
 Betaaj Badshah (1994)
 Phool (1993)
 Chandra Mukhi (1993)
 Aaina (1993)
 Yalgaar (1992)
Mere Baad (1988)
 Naqli Chehra (Video) (1987)
 Thodisi Bewafaii (1980)

Television
Bloody Brothers (2022) web series on ZEE5
 Kaisa Ye Pyar Hai (2005)
 Noorjahan (2000-2001)
 1857 Kranti (2000–01)
 Kittie Party
 Heena (1998-2003)
 Ghutan (1997-1998)
 Jai Hanuman (1997-2000)
 Andaz (1994)
 The Great Maratha (1994)
 The Sword of Tipu Sultan (1990)
 Chhoti Badi Baatein (1986)
 Kavita

References

External links
 

Year of birth missing (living people)
Living people
Indian film actresses
Actresses in Hindi cinema
Actresses from Uttar Pradesh
Indian television actresses